Ramblers Cricket Club Ground  is a cricket ground in Bloemfontein, Free State, South Africa, on the north side of Zastron Street.

The first recorded match on the ground was in 1892, when an Orange Free State XXII played the touring WW Read's XI.  It served as Orange Free State's main home ground from 1904 to 1986. There were 146 first-class matches there and 16 List A matches.

References

External links
 Ramblers Cricket Club Ground at CricketArchive

Cricket grounds in South Africa
Sports venues in the Free State (province)